Ann Marie DeAngelo is an American choreographer, director, producer, teacher, consultant and former dancer - an expert in all areas of dance.  She was leading ballerina with the Joffrey Ballet, where early on she was pegged by Time magazine as "one of America's most outstanding ballerinas" and where she later served as associate director at the time of the company's move to Chicago in 1995.  

DeAngelo was the founding artistic director of Mexico's Ballet de Monterrey, and served as artistic director of Ballet Omaha during the 1990s. She founded her own experimental troupe in the late 1980s called Ballet D'Angelo, creating several full-evening productions, which toured extensively in Europe.

She is currently the director of DeAngelo Productions, an umbrella company for creating and producing dance related projects. She continues to work internationally as a director, choreographer, and teacher.

Early life and education
DeAngelo was born in Pennsylvania and grew up in Glendale, California.  Her mother took her to ballet class at age  to overcome shyness before she started kindergarten.

Career

Dancing
Renowned for a "powerful virtuoso technique", DeAngelo was trained in Burbank, California, with Frederika Mohr in the Cecchetti method of ballet, and later with Kirov Ballet veterans Anatole Vilzak and Ludmilla Schollar at San Francisco Ballet School under a Ford Foundation scholarship. She landed her first job with the San Francisco Opera Ballet.  In New York she joined Joffrey II as an apprentice before joining the Joffrey Ballet in 1973. She worked with the Joffrey for 10 years, performing in works such as Viva Vivaldi, The Taming of the Shrew by John Cranko; the Cowgirl in Agnes de Mille's Rodeo, Pas des Deesses by Robert Joffrey; a reconstruction of La Vivandiere by Arthur Saint-Léon; As Time Goes By, Deuce Coupe II and Cacklin' Hen by Twyla Tharp; and works by Frederick Ashton, George Balanchine, Agnes de Mille, William Forsythe, Kurt Jooss, Antony Tudor, and others. She performed the Doll in Petrushka with Rudolf Nureyev at New York State Theater (currently David H. Koch Theater). In the mid-1980s she was a member of the Frankfurt Ballet under directorship of William Forsythe.

Throughout her performing career she worked internationally as a guest artist with various ballet companies including the Royal Winnipeg Ballet and Royal Ballet of Flanders; dance festivals including Jacob's Pillow; and independent tours such as Stars of American Ballet (with Fernando Bujones), Stars of World Ballet in Australia (some talent included Margot Fonteyn, and others including Bujones, Wayne Eagling, Flemming Flindt, Cynthia Gregory, Māris Liepa, Yoko Morishita, Danilo Radojevic, Merle Park, David Wall), and Dance, Dance, Dance with Frank Augustyn in Canada.  She competed in the International Ballet Competition in Varna, Bulgaria (1976) where she received a special award for technical excellence, and was the featured dancer in a TV special on CBS about the competition.  At the competition, she met the legendary ballerina Alicia Alonso, and was invited to perform at her International Ballet Festival in Havanna, Cuba.  She later created works on the company. 

In 1980, she was featured in a dance film about Anna Pavlova called Pavlova: A Tribute to the Legendary Ballerina (1982).  In 1989 she performed on Sesame Street with James "Skeeter Rabbit" Higgins in a duet created by Toni Basil called Stop Dancing.

Choreography
DeAngelo has choreographed nearly 75 ballets and other works in dance. She created her first work in 1980, called La Grande Faux Pas.  In 1984 she received a Jerome Robbins Foundation grant to create a piece for the Joffrey II called In Kazmidity with music by Léo Delibes (later staged for Ballet Trockadero in 1990).  She soon began to explore her choreographic aesthetic of mixing dance styles and blending forms.  She choreographed Autumn Baachanal for the film Pavlova: A Tribute to the Legendary Ballerina, performing with Ron Reagan Jr.

In 1990 DeAngelo created Out of Silence with music by Yanni for the National Ballet of Cuba; and also a pas de trois called Lilith featuring Lorena Feijoo.  Both these works later were integrated into a piece for Ballet de Monterrey called Paradiso (1991).  Hip-hop pioneer Steffan "Mr. Wiggles" Clemente was featured in that work in a leading role, the first time a street dancer had been integrated into a traditional ballet (hip-hop classes did not exist at that time).

DeAngelo created several works for Ballet de Monterrey, including Mademoiselle de M, a 35-minute work based on Theophile's Mademoiselle de Maupin with music by Franz Liszt and Enigma; Le Papillon, to music of Jacques Offenbach; and a re-staging of The Nutcracker.

In 2003, DeAngelo collaborated with composer Conni Ellisor to bring the Bell Witch legend to life in The Bell Witch for Nashville Ballet, with an original score by Ellisor and 3-D scenic design by Gerald Marks. For this she was nominated for a Benois de la Danse Award and a segment of the ballet was performed at the Bolshoi Theatre, Moscow.

DeAngelo was a choreographer for the first National Choreographers Initiative, and for Dance Break, 2006. In 2007 DeAngelo began a work-in-development called In the Mix! The piece included ballet dancers, hip hop and tap dance artists, Cirque du Soleil veterans, gymnastics, and cheerleading in a cross-genre exploration of movement in many forms.  This work was performed and evolved into America Dances, her 2012 production in development under her non-profit DeAngelo Productions. The evening is a variety show of dance, an amalgamation of all forms of American dance and dancers.

In 2010 DeAngelo choreographed The Promise, a new musical created for the Shanghai Expo 2010.  DeAngelo returned to Beijing, China in 2017 choreographing for another new musical based on Kublai Khan called Xanadu. Later the title was changed to Dream Dances when it as recreated in Lanqi a province of Xilinhot in Inner Mongolia.

DeAngelo's choreography was seen at City Center in New York, and the Bolshoi Theater in Moscow (May 2013).

DeAngelo has presented choreography from 2002 to 2015 as part of her multigenre dance-extravaganza productions that she also produced and directed at City Center in New York City, and in 2018 The Cobbler & the Ballerina at the Smith Center for the Performing Arts in Las Vegas, Nevada.

She has taught choreography through the perspective of focus at University of California, Irvine, University of California, Santa Barbara and Hotchkiss School (2017, 2018)

Artistic director
Ballet D'Angelo – under DeAngelo's direction, Ballet D'Angelo toured extensively in Europe and Cuba from 1984 to 1988.  Works included Zeitgiest I and II, The Last of the Best, and Gypsie Band.

Ballet de Monterrey – as founding artistic director of Ballet de Monterrey, DeAngelo worked with mentor Alicia Alonso who allowed her to use several Cuban dancers, teachers and ballet masters. DeAngelo also used American dancers and imported unique talent such as US Olympic team rhythmic gymnast Charlene Edwards and Mr. Wiggles - introducing a cross-pollination of work to Mexico.  DeAngelo created a classical yet innovative "company of the Americas".  She received the Margot Fonteyn Award for special artistic achievement for her contributions.

Ballet Omaha – during her season as artistic director of Ballet Omaha she produced works by George Balanchine, Ann Carlson, Lew Christensen, Laura Dean, Charles Moulton, and others.

Joffrey Ballet of Chicago  – in 1995 as associate artistic director, DeAngelo created a vision for the Joffrey's relocation from New York, and along with Artistic Director Gerald Arpino, a successful vision for its artistic future. Arpino created an evening called "Legends" spotlighting female choreographers choreography about iconic female legend singers. Choreographers included DeAngelo, Laura Dean, Joanna Haigood, Ann Reinking, and Margo Sappington.

In the 2000s DeAngelo was co-artistic director of the Hamptons Dance Festival with Cynthia Gregory.

Director - producer and other work
DeAngelo has created and staged many special shows and events, including Shall We Dance, a dance tribute to composer Richard Rodgers as part of the Rodgers Centenary celebration in 2002.

Since 2002 DeAngelo has staged the annual gala for Career Transition For Dancers.  Those shows include: Dancing on Air, That's Entertainment, One World, Dance Rocks!, America Dances!, 25th Anniversary, and A Halloween Thriller, and Jump for Joy in 2012, Broadway & Beyond in 2013, New York, New York in 2014, 30th Anniversary Celebration in 2015. In 2010 she commissioned Marvin Hamlisch to write a new song called "I'm Really Dancing" with lyrics by Rupert Holmes for that year's gala. In these evenings, DeAngelo's "amalgamations of dance", she has presented and commissioned over 200 works by a variety of dance companies and choreographers from different disciplines. She has worked with theater artists and Tony Award winners such as Paula Abdul, Debbie Allen, Michael Douglas, Christine Ebersole, Robert Fairchild, Catherine Zeta-Jones, James Earl Jones, Sutton Foster, Savion Glover, Jane Krakowski, Angela Lansbury, Liza Minnelli, Bebe Neuwirth, Billy Porter, Ann Reinking, Chita Rivera, Kelly Ripa, Tommy Tune, Ben Vereen, and Karen Ziemba, as well as producer Nigel Lythgoe.

In 2001 she created and directed The Variety Show – Jugglin' Styles which premiered at the Annenberg Center in Philadelphia.

In 2009 she was director of the show Thank You, Gregory – A Tribute to Legends of Tap that opened at the Annenberg Center for the Performing Arts in Philadelphia, featuring Maurice Hines and Jason Samuels Smith.

Also in 2009 she directed Ghettomade, a work created by Mr. Wiggles that premiered at Sadlers Wells in London. Currently the show is expanding to include Rock Steady Crew.

In 2012 she conceived, produced, and directed the 125th anniversary gala for Capezio at City Center in New York City in 2012.

In 2016 Career Transition for Dancers merged with the Actors Fund and is a part of Bebe Neuwirth's Dancers Resource; however, DeAngelo continued to produce and direct fundraisers in 2016 and 2017.

She returned to produce and direct the Capezio 130th anniversary show in 2018, and the Capezio Awards. Awardees included Debbie Allen, Michelle Dorrance, David Parsons, Wendy Whelan, and Mr. Wiggles, who performed on the evening celebration along with others including Bessie Award winner Ephrat Asherie, Contemporary West Dance Theatre, DNA, Nevada Ballet Theatre, Parsons Dance, and SYTYCD winner Lex Ishimoto. Host was Nigel Lythgoe, and Savion Glover was a presenter.

She has taught for numerous dance companies and universities, as well as workshops to non-dancers called "Bringing Performance to Life" at resorts and spas. She has taught personalities such as Bette Midler.

Choreography
 2018 The Cobbler & The Ballerina, Capezio 130th Anniversary, Las Vegas
 2017 Code Vivaldi, Hotchkiss School; Dream City, Beijing, China
 2017 Dream City (Kublai Kahn), LanQi, Inner Mongolia  
 2016 The Cello Song, Rosie's Theater Kids, New York City
 2015 American Dance Collage, City Center, New York City
 2014 Guy.., National Choreography Initiative gala
 2013 Last Time I Cry, Bolshoi Theatre, Moscow
 2012 The Cobbler Rap/The Cobbler & The Ballerina,(Capezio 125th Anniversary Gala) 
 2012 Blackberry Winter, American Repertory Ballet
 2011 She Remembers?, Career Transition for Dancers (CTFD) Gala, City Center NYC
 2010 The Promise (a musical), Shanghai Expo 2010
 2010 I'm Really Dancing,  Final CTFD Gala (new song by Marvin Hamlisch)
 2010 The Process: Discovery & Integration, National Choreography Initiative
 2009 A Tribute to Broadway, Ballet de Monterrey
 2009 Ghettomade: A Journey Thru Time, Sadler's Wells Theatre, London
 2008 La Noche, Ballet de Monterrey, Joyce Theater
 2008 In The Mix!,  Workshop, New York City
 2007 P.E.A.C.E., Rosie's Theater Kids
 2007 Jugglin' Styles II, (creator/contributing)
 2007 Dance Rocks,  CTFD Gala Opening number
 2006 The Guy in the White Shirt, Marymount Manhattan College
 2006 Dance Break NYC, (Mystical Undines; Personals)
 2005 Paradise Re-visited, Ballet de Monterrey, Mexico
 2004 The Guy in the White Shirt, (workshop) National Choreography Initiative
 2004 A Glimpse2, re-created for BalletNY
 2004 Mega 21, Goucher College
 2003 The Bell Witch (one-act ghost story, original music), Nashville Ballet
 2003 Walk On, starring Mr. Wiggles, Nevada Ballet Theater
 2002 Ghost Town, Ohio Ballet
 2002 The Empty Cup, Martine van Hamel
 2001 A Glimpse, Oregon Ballet Theatre
 2001 Successful Worry, Ballet Pacifica
 2000 Nike Nana, Pittsburgh Ballet Theater
 1999 Blackberry Winter, Ballet Pacifica (2000 Ohio Ballet, ABT II)
 1999 Crisis, Connecticut Ballet (Zig Zag)
 1998 Duet, Hamptons Dance Festival
 1998 Strings, solo for Rasta Thomas
 1998 Kali Ma, Joffrey Ballet of Chicago
 1997 Legends, Joffrey Ballet of Chicago
 1995 Lilith, Ballet Omaha
 1994 MAYA (mini-opera), Ballet de Monterrey
 1993-1991 PARAISO, Ballet de Monterrey
 1992 Mademoiselle de Maupin, Ballet de Monterrey
 1991 The Gift, Alicia Alonso - National Ballet of Cuba
 1991 Don't Look Back, Martine VanHamel/Kevin McKenzie - Jacob's Pillow Dance
 1991 La Traviata, Mexico City Opera
 1990 The Nutcracker, Ballet de Monterrey
 1990 Out of Silence, National Ballet of Cuba
 1988 Concerto for Elvis, Long Beach Ballet
 1988 Gypsie Band, Ballet D'Angelo
 1987 What's Real, Iowa Ballet
 1986 Zeitgeist II, Ballet D'Angelo
 1986 The Last of the Best, Ballet D'Angelo
 1986 Zeitgiest 1, Ballet D'Angelo
 1984 Next Time, New Amsterdam Ballet
 1984 In Kazmidity, Joffrey II Dancers, Les Ballets Trockadero de Monte Carlo
 1984 Midler Medley, Ballet D'Angelo
 1983 Stay With Me, tour with Maya Plisetskaya
 1982 Pavlova, CBC film; Tribute to Pavlova (stage, 1982)

References

External links
 

American choreographers
American ballerinas
Living people
Joffrey Ballet dancers
Year of birth missing (living people)
American female dancers
American dancers